Fantastic Cinema (published in the US as The World of Fantastic Films: An Illustrated Survey) is a book by Peter Nicholls published in 1984.

Plot summary
Fantastic Cinema is a book that explores the history of science fiction and fantasy films.

Reception
Dave Langford reviewed Fantastic Cinema for White Dwarf #63, and stated that "Nicholls is eclectic and witty; he passes the important test of being interesting to read even when discussing films one has never seen and will probably never see".

Reviews
Review by Neil Barron (1985) in Fantasy Review, February 1985
Review by Gene DeWeese (1985) in Science Fiction Review, Fall 1985

References

Science fiction books